Champakulam Thachan is a 1992 Malayalam film. Directed by Kamal, this film has Madhu, Vineeth, Murali, Monisha, Rambha and Nedumudi Venu in leading roles. The music and background score is by Raveendran. It was written by Sreenivasan based on Shakespeare's tragedy Othello.

Cast
Madhu as Valiya Ashari
Murali as Raghavan
Vineeth as Chanthutti
Nedumudi Venu as Kuttiraman
Jagathy Sreekumar as Rajappan
Monisha as Ammu
Rambha as Devi
K.R.Vijaya
Sreenivasan as Bhargavan
Riza Bava as Thommikunju
Jose Pellissery as Vakkachen

Soundtrack
Music: Raveendran, Lyrics: Bichu Thirumala
 "Champakulam Thachan" - K. J. Yesudas, M. G. Sreekumar
 "Chellam" - K. J. Yesudas, K. S. Chitra
 "Makale Paathimalare" (D) - K. J. Yesudas, Lathika
 "Makale Paathimalare" (F) - K. S. Chitra
 "Olikkunnuvo" - K. J. Yesudas

References 

1990s Malayalam-language films
1992 drama films
Indian drama films
Films with screenplays by Sreenivasan
Films directed by Kamal (director)